Francisco Arias (1533 – 15 May 1605) was a Spanish Catholic author, known as a writer of ascetical treatises.

Arias was born in Seville and joined the Society of Jesus at the age of twenty-six. He also served as rector of the colleges at Trigueros and Cádiz.

Arias was commonly regarded as a saint, and was known for his gift of prayer and his spirit of penance. He was especially devoted to the care of blacks, Moors, and the inmates of hospitals and prisons. Arias was held in high esteem by John of Avila, and his works are recommended by St. Francis of Sales in his Introduction to a Devout Life.

Works
Spiritual Profit
Treatise on the Rosary
Imitation of Our Lady
Imitation of Christ
Mental Prayer
The Use of the Sacraments
The Promises of God
The Turpitude and Grievousness of Sin

References

External links
 Full text of "The Charity of Jesus Christ" (archive.org)
Full text of "Tractatus de Rosario de B. Virginis Mariae" (Google Books)
Full text of "De imitatione beatiss. virginis Mariae" (Google Books)
Full text of "De imitatione Dominae Nostrae gloriosae Virginis et Dei parae Mariae" (Google Books)

People from Seville
1533 births
1605 deaths
16th-century Spanish Roman Catholic theologians
16th-century Spanish Jesuits
University of Alcalá alumni